Georg Lennart Schnéevoigt (8 November 1872 – 28 November 1947) was a Finnish conductor and cellist, born in Vyborg, Grand Duchy of Finland, which is now in Russia, to Ernst Schnéevoigt and Rosa Willandt.

Career 

Schnéevoigt began his career as a cellist performing throughout Europe in the 1890s. He was principal cellist of the Helsinki Philharmonic from 1896 to 1902. After this, he conducted many orchestras including the Kaim Orchestra (now the Munich Philharmonic Orchestra), Riga Philharmonic Orchestra which he founded, Oslo Philharmonic (1919–1921), the Stockholm Concert Society (later the Royal Stockholm Philharmonic Orchestra), the Sydney Symphony, and the Los Angeles Philharmonic. From 1930 until his death in 1947, Schnéevoigt was chief conductor of the Malmö Symphony Orchestra.

In Europe young Schnéevoigt was considered skilled, but by an accounting  of the Los Angeles Philharmonic, Schnéevoigt's conducting style was characterised as "flaccid", "paunchy", "phlegmatic", and "plodding", with "little or no sense of direction so far as discipline was concerned". This notwithstanding, his passion for the music of Sibelius was such that he cried when conducting his works.

The accounting by Los Angeles Philharmonic is not in accordance with the contemporary critique of Schnéevoigt's conducting. The critiques published in the papers of Los Angeles during 1927–1929 were mainly positive and especially Schnéevoigt's Mahler interpretations were applauded. A reason for Schnéevoigt's apparent loss of reputation, may be that he was succeeded by two legendary conductors (Artur Rodziński and Otto Klemperer) and so his achievements were forgotten.

Life 

Schnéevoigt's married pianist Sigrid Sundgren-Schnéevoigt in 1907, she and Schnéevoigt would often perform together.

Schnéevoigt died in Malmö, Sweden in 1947 at the age of 75, he was buried at Hietaniemi Cemetery.

Schnéevoigt and Sibelius 
Schnéevoigt was a close friend of composer Jean Sibelius and often performed Sibelius's orchestral music. He conducted the first performance in Finland of Luonnotar in January 1914. He discovered the manuscripts of Sibelius's tone poems "Lemminkäinen and the Maidens" and "Lemminkäinen in Tuonela" (from the Lemminkäinen Suite), which had been thought lost, and gave their first performance since 1894.

On 3 June 1934, Schnéevoigt and the Finnish National Orchestra traveled to London, there Schnéevoigt made the first recording of Sibelius's Symphony No 6. It was originally planned for Robert Kajanus, a close friend of Sibelius, to record the symphony, but because of his death in 1933 it was instead done by Schnéevoigt.

References

External links 
Georg Schnéevoigt biography. Divine Art Recordings Group.

1872 births
1947 deaths
Musicians from Vyborg
People from Viipuri Province (Grand Duchy of Finland)
Finnish people of German descent
Finnish classical cellists
Finnish conductors (music)
People of the Royal Stockholm Philharmonic Orchestra